Wang Lina (born 8 July 1971) is a Chinese sport shooter who competed in the 1992 Summer Olympics.

References

1971 births
Living people
Chinese female sport shooters
ISSF pistol shooters
Olympic shooters of China
Shooters at the 1992 Summer Olympics
Shooters at the 1990 Asian Games
Shooters at the 1994 Asian Games
Asian Games medalists in shooting
Asian Games gold medalists for China
Asian Games silver medalists for China
Medalists at the 1990 Asian Games
Medalists at the 1994 Asian Games
People from Yingkou
Sport shooters from Liaoning